The Museum of disABILITY History is a museum related to the history of people with disabilities from medieval times to the present era.  Located at 3826 Main Street in Buffalo, New York, US, it is the only "brick-and-mortar" museum in the United States dedicated exclusively to preserving the history of people with disabilities. The museum seeks to promote a higher level of societal awareness and understanding, and a change in attitudes, perceptions and actions that will result in people with disabilities having the greatest possible participation in their communities.

History of the museum 
People Inc. first organized the idea for the Museum of disABILITY History in 1998 after James Boles, Ed.D. President and CEO of People Inc. discovered there was no museum or single education resource to send students to learn about the history of people with disabilities.  In 2003 the Museum received its Provisional Charter from the New York State Department of Education Board of Regents and continues to be a project of People Inc. The Museum moved to its current location in late 2010, and received its Permanent Charter from the New York State Board of Regents in January 2011.

Collections 
The Museum's exhibits, collections, archives and educational programs create awareness and a platform for dialogue and discovery.  Photographs, rare books, historic artifacts utilized by people with disabilities, these records have helped shaped the lives of these individuals with disabilities, and many primary sources and archival materials, the earliest dating to 1750 are all part of the rapidly growing collection.  Included in the Museum's collection is a 1963 Greaves Thundersley Invacar.  Few Invacars exist today in Europe and the only known Invacar in North America is at the Museum of disABILITY History.

Exhibits 
The Museum of disABILITY History offers many on-site, traveling and virtual exhibitions. All exhibits feature various artifacts, unique historical facts, and are presented in an unbiased fashion. Through the use of visual materials, the museum explores the various attitudes beliefs and portrayal of disability that have helped shape the lives of people with disability. Permanent and changing exhibits cover a wide variety of topics related to disability history. Exhibits included historic images of individuals with disabilities and view of institutions and facilities that were used to care for people with various disabilities throughout history. This exhibits serves as an educational policy from which the future of an accepting society can be seen. The aims of this museum is to develop a higher level of societal awareness and understanding and a change in attitudes perceptions and actions that will result in people with disabilities having the greatest possible participation in their communities. http://www.people-inc.org

On-site exhibitions 
•	Throughout History- An introduction to Disability History.  "As long as there have been people, there have been people with disabilities".

•	Almshouses and Schools- The evolution of care for individuals of disabilities and the development of early Poorhouses, Almshouses and Schools.

•	The Path to the Institution- Highlighting the establishment of the early State Schools and Institutions in New York State.

•	Eugenics in America- A look at the history of Eugenics in America, including negative and positive eugenics.

•	Pop-Culture- A look at the role of disability in popular culture

•	Sports and Disability- A look at the participation of individuals with disabilities in sports and recreation as well as the development of adaptive sports.

•	The Evolution of Adaptive Equipment- The history and development of mobility aids and adaptive equipment.

•	The Invacar Exhibit- a 3-wheeled carriage "Invacar" powered by a motor cycle type engine were made in Britain from 1948 – 1977.

Traveling exhibitions 
The Museum of disABILITY History also offers a series of "traveling exhibits" featuring thought-provoking topics in disability history.
Some of these exhibits include:

•	The Quest for the Cure: Polio in America- four panel banner stand exhibit that documents the Polio epidemics of the 20th century. The exhibit explores the disease, how polio changed America, the development of the March of Dimes and the vaccines developed by Salk and Sabin.

•	Self Advocacy: A History of People Speaking Up for Themselves: a four panel banner stand exhibit that traces the Self-Advocacy Movement from early educational facilities to the development of organizations established for and by individuals with disabilities.  This includes the enactment of the Americans with Disabilities Act.

•	The Kennedy Connection- A four panel banner stand exhibit that showcases the contributions of the Kennedy family, from the founding of the Joseph P. Kennedy Jr. Foundation to the establishment of the Presidents Commission on People with Intellectual Disabilities.  It also highlights the work of Eunice Kennedy Shriver and Edward M. Kennedy.

•	Moving Forward, Looking Back- A two panel banner stand exhibit that shows how the evolution of services and social attitudes toward individuals with intellectual disabilities have changed over the past two thousand years.

•	In the Game: Sports and Disability- a three panel banner stand time-line style exhibit that chronicles events and individuals that have transformed sport and recreation for people with disabilities. From early educational and habilitation efforts to highly competitive modern amateur and professional activities.

•	Madness in America: A History of Mental Health- a six panel banner stand exhibit that provides an overview of the history of mental health in the United States.  It features the development and expansion of mental institutions, changes in medical care and treatment, and contributions by individuals who were recipients of mental health services.

Virtual exhibitions 
The Museum of disABILITY History's web site makes disABILITY history accessible to everyone.

Programs and events
•	Kids on the Block of WNY- Kids on the Block is an educational puppet troupe that travels to elementary schools across Western New York promoting disability awareness and the acceptance of differences. The program is internationally acclaimed and the troupe sponsored by the Museum of disABILITY History is one of over 1,700 troupes worldwide.

•	New York State Disability History Curriculum K-12- Promoting Disability Awareness and History in classrooms throughout New York State. Lesson Plans, bibliographies, and supplemental materials are located in the Teacher Resources section of the Museum of Disability's website.

•	Teacher In-Service programs- Outreach program providing teachers with the tools needed to utilize our lesson plans and Museum exhibits to teach students lessons on Disability History.

•	Disability History and Etiquette Program- Outreach program that provides an overview of proper disability etiquette as well as a brief introduction to Disability History.

•	Boy Scout Disability Awareness Merit Badge- Merit badge program for scout troops that takes place at the Museum.

•	Annual Disabilities Film Festival and Speaker Series- The goal is to provide entertainment and information while exploring issues faced by individuals with disabilities. Various films along with prominent speakers will be featured. The programs are intended to educate viewers, offer different perspectives, challenge stereotypes, and celebrate the contributions of people with disabilities to popular culture.

•	University at Buffalo Center for Disability Studies- The Museum's sponsor, People Inc., recently teamed up with the University at Buffalo to establish the Center for Disability Studies.  The purpose of the center is to encourage the study, teaching, and accurate representation of disability history and of individuals with disabilities.

Publications 
The Museum recently started publishing books relating to Disability History in the form of the "Abandoned History" series published by People Inc's "People Ink Press".  The Press most recently published Dr. Skinner's Remarkable School for "Colored Deaf, Dumb, and Blind Children" 1857–1860. Upcoming publications topics include: Early human service programs of Niagara County, State School of New York, and a Directory of historically used Disability terminology.

References

External links 
 
 People Inc. website

Museums established in 2003
Museum of disABILITY History
Museums in Erie County, New York
Medical museums in the United States
History museums in New York (state)
History of disability
Museums in Buffalo, New York